Robert "Bob" Decker (November 11, 1922 – October 19, 1999) was an American politician and educator.

Decker was born in Wimberley, Hays County, Texas. He went to Southwest Texas State College (now Texas State University. Decker received his bachelor's, master's and doctorate degrees from Texas A&M College of Agriculture and Life Sciences. Decker also served in the United States Army. He also serve on a school board in Texas. Decker moved to Bemidji, Minnesota, in 1968, with his wife and family and taught at Bemidji State University. He also served as the President of Bemidji State University. Decker served in the Minnesota Senate from 1987 to 1990 and was a Republican. In 1996, he moved to Ventura, California with his wife. He died from Alzheimer's disease in Ventura, California.

References

1922 births
1999 deaths
People from Bemidji, Minnesota
People from Ventura, California
People from Wimberley, Texas
Military personnel from Texas
Texas State University alumni
Texas A&M University alumni
Bemidji State University faculty
School board members in Texas
Republican Party Minnesota state senators
Deaths from Alzheimer's disease